Whoopee or whoopie  may refer to:

 Whoopee , an exclamation used as a form of cheering or to express jubilation
 Whoopee or whoopie, a euphemism for sexual intercourse
 Whoopee!, a 1928 musical comedy
 Whoopee! (film), a 1930 adaptation of the musical
 Whoopee! (comics), a British comic book magazine of the 1970s and '80s
 Whoopee cap, a type of zigzagged felt cap
 Whoopee cushion, a practical joking device that mimics flatulence
 Whoopie pie, a kind of cookie sandwich
 Whoopie sling, a type of rope sling used in tree pruning and hammock suspension
 Whoopie hook, a type of hook or fastener used in a whoopie sling

See also
 Whoopee Camp, developers of the game Tomba!
 Whoopee Hill, a hill in Ohio County, Kentucky
 Whoopi (TV series), an American sitcom of the 2000s starring Whoopi Goldberg